Andrew Osborn (born 10 October 1972) is a former Australian rules footballer who played with the South Adelaide Football Club in the South Australian National Football League (SANFL).

After beginning his football with local club Reynella, Andrew quickly established himself at South Adelaide in a very competitive U17 team by winning the trophy for the Most Consistent Player in 1988.  Then, in the following year, he not only won the W.J. Mahoney Cup for the best and fairest in South Adelaide's U17’s, but also the McCallum Medal for best and fairest in the SANFL U17 competition.

Progressing through the grades, Andrew was instrumental in South Adelaide’s win in the 1991 Reserves Grand Final and his football prowess naturally attracted the interest of two AFL clubs (Geelong in 1993 and Port Adelaide Football Club in 1998 (Zone Selection)), but Andrew was kept from performing on that stage by long term injuries. The self-discipline, dedication and perseverance which he showed to overcome these difficulties and to reach the pinnacle of the SANFL competition were qualities that had long been recognised as an integral part of his game.

Andrew was a great team-man, and his appointment as South Adelaide captain from 1998–2000 recognised his skills as a leader and the respect in which he was held by his fellow team-mates and the club as a whole. In 1998, the award of the Magarey Medal, and his selection in the state side, were clear indications that this same respect was afforded him by the wider South Australian community. William Magarey wanted his medal to reward players who were not only brilliant and fair, but who demonstrated the ‘power of endeavour’ and had the drive to succeed; as a vice-president himself of the South Adelaide Football Club, Magarey would have been delighted that these qualities were to be found in Andrew, who for many supporters redefined the concept of the ‘Ossie battler.’

When he retired from league football at the end of 2000, he had played 115 games and kicked 93 goals for the Panthers.

In late 2007 Andrew returned to his beloved Panthers in an off-field role, becoming the club's Marketing Manager.

References

External links

South Adelaide Football Club
SAFC Profile

1972 births
Living people
South Adelaide Football Club players
Magarey Medal winners
Australian rules footballers from South Australia
Place of birth missing (living people)
Reynella Football Club players
People educated at Cardijn College